Campbell Hill is a village in Jackson County, Illinois, United States. The population was 309 at the 2020 census.

Geography
Campbell Hill is located in northwestern Jackson County at  (37.928964, -89.550350). Illinois Route 4 runs through the northeast side of the village, leading northwest  to Willisville and southeast  to Ava.

Demographics

As of the census of 2000, there were 333 people, 144 households, and 95 families residing in the village. The racial makeup of the village was 99.40% White, 0.30% Native American, 0.30% from other races. Hispanic or Latino of any race were 0.30% of the population.

There were 144 households, out of which 31.9% had children under the age of 18 living with them, 52.1% were married couples living together, 10.4% had a female householder with no husband present, and 34.0% were non-families. 29.9% of all households were made up of individuals, and 21.5% had someone living alone who was 65 years of age or older.  The average household size was 2.31 and the average family size was 2.86.

In the village, the population was spread out, with 23.7% under the age of 18, 9.6% from 18 to 24, 25.5% from 25 to 44, 22.5% from 45 to 64, and 18.6% who were 65 years of age or older.  The median age was 39 years. For every 100 females, there were 99.4 males.  For every 100 females age 18 and over, there were 91.0 males.

The median income for a household in the village was $33,929, and the median income for a family was $48,750. Males had a median income of $37,083 versus $26,250 for females. The per capita income for the village was $17,009.  None of the families and 5.5% of the population were living below the poverty line, including no under eighteens and 20.0% of those over 64.

Notable people
 Bucky Bockhorn, professional basketball player (Cincinnati Royals, currently Sacramento Kings - 1958-65)
 Dean Ehlers, college basketball coach

References

External links
 Photos of Campbell Hill
 St. John Lutheran Church

Villages in Jackson County, Illinois
Villages in Illinois